Brian John Busby (born August 29, 1962) is a Canadian literary historian and anthologist. Born and raised in Montreal, Quebec, he attended John Abbott College and Concordia University. Busby began his writing career writing daytime soap operas and educational material for Radio Canada International.

He is best known for his biography of John Glassco, A Gentleman of Pleasure: One Life of John Glassco, Poet, Memoirist, Translator, and Pornographer and for his 2003 book Character Parts: Who's Really Who in Canlit, which discusses the real-life inspirations behind characters in Canadian fiction.

He is a former president of the Federation of BC Writers.

See also
 Brian Moore's early fiction

References

External links
 

1962 births
Living people
Canadian anthologists
21st-century Canadian historians
Canadian male non-fiction writers
Canadian male screenwriters
Canadian radio writers
Canadian television writers
Concordia University alumni
Canadian male television writers
Writers from Montreal
Writers from British Columbia